Joint Task Force Empire Shield is an element of the New York State Division of Military and Naval Affairs partly responsible for the military defense of New York City, primarily the deterrence and prevention of internal security threats. It is composed of personnel from the New York Army National Guard, the New York Air National Guard, and the New York Naval Militia.

History

Joint Task Force Empire Shield was activated in response to the September 11 attacks.

As of 2009, New York was spending $16 million per biennium to maintain Joint Task Force Empire Shield. By 2011 this had grown to $19.5 million. For 2018 the proposed budget for Empire Shield was $33 million.

Organization
Empire Shield is composed of three ad hoc companies: Alpha, Bravo, and Charlie. Personnel are volunteers drawn from the New York Army National Guard, the New York Air National Guard, and the New York Naval Militia who are placed on state active duty status. In 2017, the force had an authorized, but not actual, strength of 500 personnel. The three companies rotate between three mission assignments: quick reaction force (QRF), pop-up mission, and training cycle.

The quick reaction force fulfills the National Guard reaction forces mission in New York City, which provides combat units "designed to respond to an incident ahead of federal assets with the capability to be logistically self-sustaining for up to 72 hours". Pop-up mission elements, meanwhile, conduct preventative patrols of New York transportation hubs including Penn Station, Grand Central Terminal, John F. Kennedy International Airport, and LaGuardia Airport. Joint Task Force Empire Shield also conducts random patrols at the Indian Point Energy Center, a nuclear power plant in Buchanan, New York.

Joint Task Force Empire Shield is headquartered at Fort Hamilton.

See also

 Military aid to the civil power

Notes

References

Joint task forces of the United States Armed Forces
New York National Guard
National Guard (United States)
Military units and formations established in the 2000s